Thomas Hood (1799–1845) was an English poet, author and humorist.

Thomas Hood may also refer to:

 Thomas Hood (Australian politician), member of the New South Wales Legislative Council
 Thomas Hood (mathematician) (1556–1620), first lecturer in mathematics appointed in England
 Thomas Hood (mayor) (died 1702), mayor of New York 1701–1702
 Thomas Hood (Leominster MP), English politician
 Thomas Hood (American politician) (1816–1883), American politician
 Tom Hood (1835–1874), writer